Henry Jenney was Archdeacon of Dromore from 1707 until his death in 1742.

Jenny was educated at Trinity College, Dublin. His son was Henry Jenney (Archdeacon of Armagh), from 1733 to 1738.

Notes

18th-century Irish Anglican priests
Archdeacons of Dromore
Alumni of Trinity College Dublin
People from Lisburn
1742 deaths